Myronivsky power station (also known as Mironivskaya TEC) is a coal-fired power station at the urban-type settlement of Myronivskyi close to Debaltseve, Ukraine.

It was built in 1953 and has an installed capacity of 100 MW.

See also

 List of power stations in Ukraine

Coal-fired power stations in Ukraine